{{Taxobox 
| image = File:L208.jpg
| image_caption = Adult female of E. fornicatus
| regnum = Animalia
| phylum = Arthropoda
| classis = Insecta
| ordo = Coleoptera
| familia = Curculionidae
| subfamilia = Scolytinae
| genus = Euwallacea
| species = E. fornicatus
|subdivision_ranks = species in the complex
|subdivision =
Tea shot hole borer clade a
Tea shot hole borer clade b
Polyphagous shot hole borer
Kuroshio shot hole borer
| binomial = Euwallacea fornicatus
| binomial_authority = (Eichhoff, 1868)
}}Euwallacea fornicatus is a species complex consisting of multiple cryptic species of ambrosia beetles (Coleoptera: Curculionidae: Scolytinae: Xyleborini), known as an invasive species in California, Israel and South Africa.  The species has also been unintentionally introduced into exotic greenhouses in several European countries. As the rest of the ambrosia beetles, E. fornicatus larvae and adults feed on a symbiotic fungus (Fusarium euwallaceae) carried in a specific structure called mycangium. In E. fornicatus, the mycangium is located in the mandible. The combination of massive numbers of beetles with the symbiotic fungus kills trees, even though the fungus alone is a weak pathogen.

Euwallacea fornicatus breeds in various live hosts and is considered a severe pest of several economically important plants, such as: tea (Camellia sinensis), avocado (Persea americana), citrus (Citrus spp.) and cacao (Theobroma cacao).

Identification

 Adult 

Adult females are range between 1.9 and 2.5 mm long. They are bulky, dark brown or black and the frontal edge of the pronotum has a row of saw-like projections. Moreover, specimens have erect setae organized in rows in the elytral declivity with a costa in the posterolateral edge. As many other ambrosia beetles, males are significantly smaller, with non-functional wings.

 Larvae 
Larvae are similar to all other larvae in the family Curculionidae; legless, c-shaped and a  sclerotized head capsule.

 History of expansion 
The tea shot hole borer has been known to cause devastating damage to tea (Camellia sinensis) in at least ten different countries, including India and Sri Lanka where it is a major economic pest. In 2009, specimens matching the description for E. fornicatus were introduced into Israel, where they were documented as vectors of a new fungal plant pathogen in avocado trees. In 2012, similar fungal disease was recorded in avocado trees in California (CA). Since 2007, specimens of E. fornicatus have been documented in Florida on avocado trees. However, it is not considered a health threat because no disease is expressed.

 Taxonomy 
Even though several taxa were historically synonymized under the name E. fornicatus due to morphological similarity, some of these taxa differ in terms of economic severity and host preferences. As such, Euwallacea fornicatus is typically considered a species complex, with several clades that occur in separate regions of Southeast Asia and develop in different hosts. Early phylogenetic work using the DNA mitochondrial gene COI suggested that there were three major clades classified as E. fornicatus, supporting the idea of at least three different species with phylogeographic boundaries within the species complex. Later work (in 2018) resolved that there were actually four major lineages, one containing "true" E. fornicatus, another bearing the resurrected name Euwallacea fornicatior, another bearing the resurrected name Euwallacea whitfordiodendrus, and another that had not been named previously, and newly described as Euwallacea kuroshio.

The first two clades, both commonly called the tea shot hole borer, are E. fornicatus and E. fornicatior; these are originally from southern Southeast Asia and introduced into Hawaii and Florida. The third clade is thought to originate from a more northern range in Southeast Asia and to have since been introduced into Los Angeles, California, Israel and South Africa. This clade has been given the common name polyphagous shot hole borer in reference to the very broad host range, and contains E. whitfordiodendrus. It has been severely affecting avocado trees in association with several Fusarium species. The fourth clade, the Kuroshio shot hole borer, is believed to have originated in the Pacific Islands and has since been introduced into San Diego county, California, and contains E. kuroshio.Kasson, M.T.; O’Donnell, K.; Rooney, A.; Sink, S.; Ploetz, R.; Ploetz, J.N.; et al., 2013. An inordinate fondness for Fusarium: phylogenetic diversity of fusaria cultivated by ambrosia beetles in the genus Euwallacea on avocado and other plant hosts. Fungal Genetic Biology 56, 147–157. Its impact has impacted many trees in San Diego County, as far south as the Tijuana River Valley Regional Park. Multiple populations of species in the E. fornicatus complex have been introduced throughout the world, causing different damage in each region where they have been introduced.

A fundamental problem remains that the morphological variation within''' the species of each clade is great enough that there is no character or even combination of characters that can be uniquely used for reliable visual identification of the different taxa; however, their DNA sequences differ by from 11-15%, and appear to be far more reliable for identification. Given that past research has generally assumed a single species was being studied, it is hoped that DNA analyses can now be applied to specimens from earlier studies to identify, post facto, which actual species were being examined, so as to better understand the biology of the different lineages.

 Etymology 
See Wallacea, region of Indonesian islands named after the naturalist Alfred Russel Wallace.

Management
The most recommended management strategies include sanitation of infected hosts and avoiding the spread of infected material. Chemical control can be considered in hosts which are not part of human consumption and some attempts of biological control have been made with little success. Moreover, resistant or tolerant varieties are considered an important aspect of the integrated pest management for this pest.

See also
 Ambrosia beetle
 Forest pathology
 Laurel wilt disease
 Xyleborus glabratus''

References

Scolytinae
Insect species groups
Beetles described in 1868